C-RAM may refer to:

 Chalcogenide RAM, an alternative name for phase-change memory
 Computational RAM, random access memory with integrated processing elements 
 Counter Rocket, Artillery, and Mortar, a weapon system

See also 
 CRAM (disambiguation)